The 1937 All-Southwest Conference football team consists of American football players chosen by various organizations for All-Southwest Conference teams for the 1937 college football season.  The selectors for the 1937 season included the Associated Press (AP).

All Southwest selections

Backs
 Billy Patterson, Baylor (AP-1 [QB])
 Dick Todd, Texas A&M (AP-1 [HB])
 Davey O'Brien, Texas Christian (AP-1 [HB]) (College Football Hall of Fame)
 Hugh Wolfe, Texas (AP-1 [FB])

Ends
 James Benton, Arkansas (AP-1)
 Sam Boyd, Baylor (AP-1)

Tackles
 I. B. Hale, Texas Christian (AP-1)
 Charles Sprague, Southern Methodist (AP-1)

Guards
 Joe Routt, Texas A&M (AP-1) (College Football Hall of Fame)
 Virgil Jones, Texas A&M (AP-1)

Centers
 Ki Aldrich, Texas Christian (AP-1)

Key
AP = Associated Press

See also
 1937 College Football All-America Team

References

All-Southwest Conference
All-Southwest Conference football teams